Kalank is a 2019 Indian Hindi-language period romantic drama film directed by Abhishek Varman and produced by Karan Johar, Hiroo Yash Johar and Apoorva Mehta under Dharma Productions and Sajid Nadiadwala under Nadiadwala Grandson Entertainment in association with Fox Star Studios as presenter and distributor. Set in the pre-independence British era, the film stars an ensemble cast of Madhuri Dixit, Sonakshi Sinha, Alia Bhatt, Varun Dhawan, Aditya Roy Kapur and Sanjay Dutt.

Kalank marked the first film distributed by Fox Star Studios following the acquisition of 21st Century Fox by Disney. 

Kalank released on 17 April 2019 on 5,300 screens worldwide, making it the widest Bollywood release of 2019 as yet. It received mixed reviews upon release, with criticism towards its direction, story, screenplay and length, but praise for its soundtrack, cinematography, production design, costumes and performances of the ensemble cast. 

At the 65th Filmfare Awards, Kalank received 9 nominations, including Best Supporting Actress (Dixit) and Best Music Director (Pritam), and won 2 awards – Best Male Playback Singer (Arijit Singh for "Kalank") and Best Choreography (Remo D'Souza for "Ghar More Pardesiya").

Plot
Satya Chaudhry is told by her doctor that she has cancer and will die soon. She goes back to her native village in the Rajputana area and requests her childhood acquaintance, Roop, to provide companionship to her husband, Dev Chaudhry who runs a liberal newspaper. Roop keeps rejecting Satya's proposal but later gets convinced by her father, Dharampal, and agrees on the condition that she will marry Dev to which Satya agrees. Once married, Dev tells Roop that he still loves Satya and that their relationship will only be cordial and platonic. A depressed Roop takes solace in music, which she begins by learning from the madam of a brothel, Bahaar Begum. She also begins working in her husband's publishing house, to use her education to her advantage. Roop expresses interest in writing about the condition of the locality in which the brothel is located, during which she meets with a womanizing blacksmith named Zafar.

Zafar wants to exact revenge on his parents, Bahaar Begum and Balraj Chaudhry (who abandoned Zafar after ending his extramarital affair with Bahaar) by seducing Roop, as she is married to Balraj's legitimate son, Dev. Roop misconstrues Zafar's intentions and falls in love with him. She also begins to develop a friendship with Dev, much to Satya's happiness and sadness. Satya dies after urging Dev to give Roop a chance and to forgive Balraj for his affair. As part of another effort to humiliate Balraj, Zafar instigates communal hatred in his friend, Abdul Khan, by demanding for the partition of India on religious lines, which Balraj and Dev do not support.

When Balraj becomes aware of Roop and Zafar's love, he confronts Bahaar and Zafar. Bahaar, who disagrees with Zafar's approach, warns Roop and tells her about Zafar's real intentions. Heartbroken, Roop consummates her marriage with Dev but insists that she would never be able to love him. As Abdul's political stance gains leverage, riots against Hindus and Sikhs in the city take place, during which the Chaudhrys decide to flee to Amritsar with the help of Zafar, but not before Saroj, the benevolent maid is brutally stabbed to death. Zafar confesses to Roop that he eventually fell in love with her, despite his early intention. While boarding a train, Zafar is stabbed in his stomach four times with a dagger by Abdul, as Roop and Dev escape.

Ten years later, Roop and Dev are interviewed about their experience by Aditya, a journalist documenting the partition. The story ends with Roop remembering Zafar and Roop's inner voice saying that the colour of love and hate is red, but it's love that often gets stigmatized or blemished.

Cast
Varun Dhawan as Zafar Chaudhry: Bahaar Begum and Balraj's illegitimate son; Dev's half-brother; Roop's love interest; Abdul's friend; Lajjo's lover
Sonakshi Sinha as Satya Chaudhry: Balraj's first daughter-in-law; Dev's first wife; Roop's friend
Alia Bhatt as Roop Sami Chaudhry: Dharampal's daughter; Balraj's second daughter-in-law; Dev's second wife; Satya's friend; Zafar's love interest; Bahaar Begum's student
Aditya Roy Kapur as Dev Chaudhry: Balraj's son; Satya and Roop's husband; Zafar's half-brother
Madhuri Dixit as Bahaar Begum: Balraj's former lover; Zafar's mother; Roop's teacher
Sanjay Dutt as Balraj Chaudhry: Bahaar Begum's former lover; Zafar and Dev's father; Satya and Roop's father-in-law
Kunal Khemu as Abdul Khan: Zafar's friend
Kiara Advani as Lajjo: Zafar's lover; Bahaar Begum's student
Achint Kaur as Saroj: Chaudhry household's housekeeper
Pawan Chopra as Dharampal Sami: Roop's father
Hiten Tejwani as Ahmed Razi: Dev's colleague
Kriti Sanon in a special appearance in the song "Aira Gaira"
Pavail Gulati as Aditya Khanna: a journalist who interviews and documents Roop's life story

Production

Development 
Kalank was conceived by Karan Johar and his father Yash Johar about 15 years prior to its release. Actress Sridevi was initially supposed to play the role of Bahaar Begum, but post her demise, the role was played by Madhuri Dixit. Production designer Amrita Mahal was brought on board to work on the production design and structure that represented Old Delhi mohalla with a mahal in Film City, Mumbai. Sajid Nadiadwala, owner and producer of Nadiadwala Grandson Entertainment, and Karan were present during the clap shot of Kalank. The estimated cost of the set was reportedly ₹15 crore. Nadiadwala and Sanjay Dutt collaborated after 24 years, having last worked on Andolan (1995) .

Filming 
Principal photography commenced in Film City, Mumbai on 18 April 2018. Madhuri Dixit and Aditya Roy Kapur joined the cast from 31 May 2018. Filming of an introductory song featuring Varun Dhawan, Alia Bhatt and Kiara Advani with nearly 500 backup dancers was completed on 7 May 2018. Rehearsals for a second dance number featuring Dhawan, Kapur and Kriti Sanon began on 31 May 2018. On 2 June 2018, a few leaked stills from the film showed Dixit donning an anarkali outfit and pasa/jhumar (hair jewellery). Sonakshi Sinha joined the cast from 14 June 2018 for a 15-day filming schedule. She is paired opposite Kapur in the film. The third schedule of filming was postponed due to injuries to Bhatt, Dhawan and Kapur and was rescheduled to commence two weeks later. Alia Bhatt announced the film wrapped on 19 January 2019.

The film's budget has been inconsistently reported. Other sources published budget estimates in the 80 crore range.

Soundtrack

The soundtrack of Kalank is composed by Pritam, with lyrics penned by Amitabh Bhattacharya. The first single track "Ghar More Pardesiya" was released on 18 March 2019, followed by the second single "First Class" on 22 March 2019, and the third single "Kalank" on 30 March 2019. The fourth and fifth songs, "Tabaah Ho Gaye" and "Aira Gaira" was released 9 April 2019 and 13 April 2019, respectively. The entire soundtrack album was released by Zee Music Company on 14 April 2019.

Release

Theatrical
Kalank was initially scheduled for release on 19 April 2019, but to reap benefits of the extended weekend, the release date was changed to 17 April 2019. A special screening of the film was organized for selected audience on 14 April 2019 prior to its release. Kalank was certified by British Board of Film Classification and Australian Classification Board with runtime of 166 minutes and was released worldwide on 17 April. The film was released on 5,300 screens worldwide making it the widest Indian film release of 2019.

Home video
Kalank was made available as VOD on Amazon Prime Video in July 2019.

Reception

Box office
Kalank had a bumper start at the box office, collecting  on opening day. But it could not maintain the momentum, and soon saw a decline in revenue, finally was declared as a box office failure.

Critical response
Kalank received mixed reviews upon release, with criticism towards its direction, story, screenplay and length, but praise for its soundtrack, cinematography, production design, costumes and performances of the ensemble cast. 

Rachit Gupta of The Times of India finds, "Kalank is a true labour of love that tells you a story laced with beautiful moments that will tug you at your heartstrings." Praising the acting of the ensemble cast, he rated it with 3 stars out of 5. Taran Adarsh rated the film with 2 stars out of 5 and though he praised the star cast for their acting, he found the film "disappointing". Writing for NDTV, Saibal Chatterjee praised Dixit and Bhatt for their screen presence and concluded her long review as, "Kalank has unmistakable contemporary resonance because it celebrates the transformative power of love and reconciliation in a time of rampant discord. It is worth a viewing not only for what it says, but also for how it says it." Writing for The Indian Express, Shubhra Gupta gave it 1.5 star out of 5 and says, "Kalank doesn’t really lift off the screen. The whole feels like a giant set, stately and ponderous and minus impact; the characters all costumed and perfumed and largely life-less, sparking only in bits and pieces." Raja Sen writing for Hindustan Times rated the film with 2.5 stars out of 5 and praised Dixit, Bhatt and Dhawan for shining in a "stunning, but soulless" film. He felt that "it is a stunningly plated meal, but needed more salt". He remarked "Directed by Abhishek Varman and shot by the masterful Binod Pradhan, the makers of Kalank not only want every frame to be a painting, but every dialogue, a proverb, every scene, a portent. The result is beautiful but tedious, an opera that needed a stout songstress to warble through it midway." Writing for the Scroll.in, Nandini Ramnath noted out that the film glamorized the partition by replicating kitsch aesthetic, and added, "The sets, that are meant to enhance the big-screen experience, end up creating a distance from the messiness of the emotional conflicts." Anupama Chopra of Film Companion rated it with 3 stars out of 5 and opined "Kalank is likely to be the most visually stunning film of this year." She also remarked "The film is an operatic fantasy filled with staggering sets, swirling fabric and heartache, but to enjoy it, you must wholly suspend disbelief." Times Of India rated the film 3 stars out of 5 and called it "a visually stunning film topped with great performances." News 18 rated the film 3 stars out of 5.

Accolades
At the 65th Filmfare Awards held on 15 February 2020 in Guwahati, Assam, Kalank received 9 nominations, including Best Supporting Actress (Dixit) and Best Music Director (Pritam), and won 2 awards – Best Male Playback Singer (Arijit Singh for "Kalank") and Best Choreography (Remo D'Souza for "Ghar More Pardesiya").

References

External links 

 
 
 

2010s historical drama films
2010s Hindi-language films
Films set in 1946
Films set in 1956
Films set in the British Raj
Indian historical drama films
Films shot in Jammu and Kashmir
Films set in the partition of India
Fox Star Studios films
Films shot in Mumbai
Indian films about cancer
Films about courtesans in India
Indian films about revenge
2010s masala films
Films about prostitution in India
2019 drama films
2019 films